REACH (Reaching Everyone for Active Citizenry@Home) is a department under the Ministry of Communications and Information (MCI). It is involved in connecting with citizens and gathering feedback on major issues.

It was a division under the Ministry of Community Development, Youth & Sports (MCYS), which was restructured on 1 November 2012. REACH was assimilated into MCI.

History
REACH was launched on 12 October 2006 when the Feedback Unit was restructured to move beyond gathering public feedback, to become the lead agency for engaging and connecting with citizens. REACH was also appointed as the Singapore government's e-engagement platform in January 2009.

External links
REACH Website

References

Organisations of the Singapore Government
2006 establishments in Singapore